= In Honour Bound =

1925 radio play

In Honour Bound is an 1880 one act British play by Sydney Grundy. It was based on a French play Un Chaine.

== 1925 Australian Radio Production ==
The play was produced for radio in Melbourne in 1925.

It was one of the first Australian radio plays. Many early radio productions only featured two actors but this one had a cast of four. Many of the cast then appeared in The Difference.

The play was performed again on Australian radio in 1932.

=== Cast of 1925 Radio Production ===
- Allen Fitzallan
- Louise Moorehead
- Terence Crisp
- Miss Eltringham
